"The Parting of the Ways" is the thirteenth episode and the season finale of the revived first series of the British science fiction television programme Doctor Who. The episode was first broadcast on BBC One on 18 June 2005. It was the second episode of the two-part story. The first part, "Bad Wolf", was broadcast on 11 June.

In the episode, the Dalek race invades the human satellite Satellite Five in the year 200,100, intending to make more Daleks by harvesting dead humans. The alien time traveller the Ninth Doctor (Christopher Eccleston) plans to use the satellite's transmitter to try to destroy every Dalek, while at the same time sending his travelling companion Rose Tyler (Billie Piper) home to keep her safe.

The episode featured Eccleston making his final appearance as the Ninth Doctor and marks the first appearance of David Tennant as the Tenth Doctor.

Plot
The Ninth Doctor uses the extrapolator on the TARDIS to generate a protective shield around it as he pilots the TARDIS to rescue Rose from the Daleks. The Doctor discovers the Daleks' Emperor survived the Time War and escaped to Earth in a crippled ship, where it rebuilt the Dalek race by harvesting DNA material from humanity.

Returning to Satellite Five, Jack uses the extrapolator to shield the top six floors of the station and sets up defensive positions. The Doctor attempts to create a delta wave generator which will destroy the Daleks, but also life on Earth. The Doctor tricks Rose into going inside the TARDIS, and remotely directs the TARDIS to return Rose to her home time to keep her safe. The Daleks invade the station, killing everyone in their path.

Rose notices the words "Bad Wolf"—words which also exist on Satellite Five — on her estate and realises that they are a message rather than a warning. She convinces Mickey and Jackie to help her open the heart of the TARDIS. Mickey uses a truck borrowed by Jackie to pull the panel on the console open and Rose is bathed in the light of the TARDIS.

The Daleks reach the top of Satellite Five, killing Jack and Lynda in the process. They file into the control room while the Doctor contemplates firing the delta wave, eventually deciding he cannot do it. Before the Daleks can kill the Doctor, Rose arrives in the TARDIS, wrapped in the glow of the time vortex. She declares that she is the "Bad Wolf", spreading the words "Bad Wolf" throughout time and space as a message to lead her there. Rose disintegrates the Dalek fleet. The Doctor begs her to relinquish her new power, but instead she resurrects Jack. Rose begins to suffer the effects of the power, and the Doctor kisses her, absorbing the entire power of the vortex into his own body to save her life. He releases it back into the TARDIS and carries an unconscious Rose back inside. They leave in the TARDIS before Jack can get back to them. As a result of absorbing the energy of the time vortex, every cell in the Doctor's body begins to die. He then regenerates into the Tenth Doctor.

Production
This was the first episode in this series which was not given a press screening prior to the broadcast. Radio Times stated, "No preview tape was available for this episode." The episode was, however, screened for BAFTA on 15 June 2005.

According to Russell T Davies in Doctor Who Magazine, Jack was left behind because they wanted to explore the effects of the regeneration on Rose (noting that Jack would have taken the regeneration "in his stride"). Jack returned in the Doctor Who spin-off series Torchwood, which began broadcasting in October 2006. In an interview in Doctor Who Magazine, Russell T Davies stated that an alternate ending for this episode was written and filmed, with the intention that it would be shown to press previewers to hide the secret of the regeneration. The "false" ending would have featured similar dialogue to the televised final scene, but the TARDIS would have scanned Rose and the viewers would have seen the display read: "LIFEFORM DYING". Davies considered this scene inferior to the one actually shown but suggested that it might be suitable as an extra on a DVD someday. On the DVD commentary, executive producer Julie Gardner and Billie Piper briefly discuss this ending, which Gardner describes as featuring Rose's death; unlike Davies, Gardner expresses doubts that it will be issued on DVD (it was not included in the Series 1 DVD set). 

David Tennant's portion of the regeneration scene was actually filmed much later than Eccleston's and without the presence of Billie Piper. Tennant's segment was recorded with him speaking to a piece of sticky tape indicating Piper's eyeline and then edited into the broadcast version. It was recorded on 21 April 2005.

The Doctor claims that he is known in Dalek legend as "the Oncoming Storm", a title that first appeared in the Virgin New Adventures novel Love and War by Paul Cornell (who wrote the episode "Father's Day"). In the novel, the title was applied to the Doctor by the Draconians.

Eccleston's planned departure was leaked early by the BBC on 30 March 2005. They claimed that he was scared of being typecast. On 4 April, they admitted that this statement had been made without consulting the actor, and were forced to apologise. In 2010, Eccleston denied the typecast claim, explaining that he was not comfortable in the working environment. He later stated that he could not get along with some of the "senior people". According to the Sunday Mirror, an interview for BBC's Doctor Who website that was taken down after his departure was announced revealed that Eccleston had planned to stay for two or three more years. Tennant was offered the role whilst watching a pre-transmission copy of Casanova with Davies and Gardner. Though Tennant initially believed the offer was a joke, he accepted the role after he realised they were serious and was announced as Eccleston's replacement on 16 April 2005.

Broadcast and reception
"The Parting of the Ways" received overnight ratings of 6.2 million viewers, a 42% audience share and the most-watched programme of the night. When final consolidated ratings were calculated, figures rose to 6.91 million. The episode was broadcast in the United States on the Sci Fi Channel on 9 June 2006. The episode received an Audience Appreciation Index score of 89.

Digital Spy's Dek Hogan wrote that the finale was "something of an anti climax", with the Bad Wolf resolution being a "let down" and the regeneration "a bit rushed" and "lacking in the sort of emotional tension that has been one of this series hallmarks". SFX gave "The Parting of the Ways" a score of nine out of ten, calling the two-parter Davies' "finest work this season", especially praising the emotional moments. However, he felt that two aspects of "The Parting of the Ways" let the story down: the Bad Wolf resolution and the deus ex machina of Rose's transformation.  Patrick Mulkern of Radio Times praised the episode, stating that it was "inventive, gripping entertainment" and that "for the first time, Doctor Who has a proper, exhilarating season finale."  Alasdair Wilkins of io9 praised the "mad energy" of the two-parter but felt the Dalek plan was "convoluted and a whole bunch of seemingly important stuff ... is brushed aside in the rush to the Doctor's big moral dilemma". Wilkins also pointed out that the story had to deal with Eccleston's abrupt departure, and as a result there was little thematic build-up and the regeneration feels "bolted on to the rest of the story". Despite this, Wilkins ranked it the best regeneration and the third best regeneration story (as of 2010).

References

External links

Doctor Who Confidential — Episode 13: The Final Battle
"They survived through me." — Episode trailer for "The Parting of the Ways"
Watch the regeneration at the BBC website

Ninth Doctor episodes
Dalek television stories
2005 British television episodes
Television shows written by Russell T Davies
Doctor Who stories set on Earth
Tenth Doctor episodes
Fiction set in the 7th millennium or beyond
Television episodes set in outer space
Doctor Who regeneration stories